Apthorp is a surname. Notable people with the surname include:

 Charles Apthorp (1698–1758), American merchant and slave trader
 John Apthorp (1935-), British businessman specializing in frozen food and alcoholic beverages
 John T. Apthorp (1769-1849), American banker
 William Foster Apthorp (1848-1913), American music professor and critic
 Benjamin Apthorp Gould (1824-1896), American astronomer
 Frederick Apthorp Paley (1815-1888), English classical scholar
 Sarah Wentworth Apthorp Morton (1759-1846), American poet
 Benjamin Apthorp Gould Fuller (1879-1956), philosopher

See also
 The Apthorp, apartment building in New York City
 Apthorp Farm, a one-time farm on the Upper West Side of Manhattan
 Apthorp's Island, Massachusetts
 Apethorpe, village in England